The Macasía River is a river of the Dominican Republic. A part of the river forms a small part of the international border between the Dominican Republic and Haiti.

See also
List of rivers of the Dominican Republic

References
 The Columbia Gazetteer of North America. 2000.
 GEOnet Names Server
CIA map

Rivers of Haiti
Rivers of the Dominican Republic
International rivers of North America
Dominican Republic–Haiti border
Border rivers